Paradeisia (before 1924: Κούρταγα - Kourtaga) is a village and a community in Arcadia, Greece, and a part of the municipality of Megalopoli. The community consists of the villages Paradeisia and Fanaiti. Paradeisia is 4 km east of Chranoi, 4 km west of Veligosti, 4 km north of Chirades and 11 km southwest of Megalopoli.

Population

See also
List of settlements in Arcadia

References

External links
History and information about Paradeisia
 Paradeisia on GTP Travel Pages

Megalopolis, Greece
Populated places in Arcadia, Peloponnese